New Bedford station is an under-construction MBTA Commuter Rail station in New Bedford, Massachusetts. The station is being constructed as part of the South Coast Rail project and is expected to open in late 2023.

History

Former service

The New Bedford and Taunton Railroad opened between its namesake cities in July 1840. An Egyptian Revival station designed by Russell Warren was located at Pearl Street in downtown New Bedford. A short extension to New Bedford Wharf to serve New York steamships opened in July 1873; the Pearl Street station remained the main station for the city. The Fall River Railroad (Watuppa Branch) opened from Fall River to Mount Pleasant Junction north of downtown Fall River in December 1875.

Service was consolidated under the New Bedford Railroad (1874), Boston, Clinton, Fitchburg and New Bedford Railroad (1876), Old Colony Railroad (1879), and finally the New Haven Railroad (1893). Schedules allowing commuting from New Bedford to Boston were not introduced until 1885. The Old Colony opened a new station, slightly to the east of the Pearl Street station, on June 21, 1886. Designed by Henry Paston Clark, it was a Romanesque stone structure.

Grade crossings in New Bedford were eliminated around 1908. Watuppa Branch service was out-competed by electric streetcars in the 1890s; the final passenger service (a single daily mixed train) ended in 1918. Passenger service to New Bedford Wharf slowly declined, and was discontinued entirely by the mid-1950s. All passenger service between New Bedford and Boston ended on September 5, 1958.

South Coast Rail

In September 2008, MassDOT released 18 potential station sites for the South Coast Rail project, including two in downtown New Bedford: Whale's Tooth (the name of a ferry parking lot) at the former station location, and State Pier at State Pier Maritime Terminal (the former steamship wharf). Only the Whale's Tooth site was selected for inclusion; a 2010 conceptual design called for a single side platform serving a single track, with a station building and bus plaza at the north end of the parking lot. The existing footbridge over Route 18 at Pearl Street would be rebuilt. A 2009 corridor plan called for mixed-use transit-oriented development along Route 18 around the new station.

On June 11, 2010, the state took ownership of the New Bedford Subdivision and several other CSX lines as part of a sale agreement. Plans released as part of the Final Environmental Impact Report in 2013 placed the Wamsutta layover yard just north of the station, with a second track serving as yard access and a freight passing track. The station building and bus plaza were removed from the design; the existing footbridge would be reused. 

In 2017, the project was re-evaluated due to cost issues. A new proposal released in March 2017 called for early service via Middleborough by 2024, followed by full service via Stoughton by 2029. In 2019, the planned station name was changed from Whale's Tooth to New Bedford for clarity. By then, a new footbridge at Willis Street (a block south of the existing bridge) was added to the design. It was to have two truss spans, with a ramp from the bridge to the station.

The MBTA awarded a $403.5 million contract for the Middleborough Secondary and New Bedford Secondary portions of the project, including New Bedford station, on August 24, 2020; construction was expected to begin later in 2020 and take 37 months. The line is expected to open in late 2023. The contract was 18% complete by November 2021, with New Bedford station construction just beginning, and 53% complete by August 2022. A $21.3 million contract for the new footbridge was awarded in December 2022. It will have a tied arch span and two elevators at the east end.

References

External links

Buildings and structures in Bristol County, Massachusetts
Under-construction MBTA Commuter Rail stations
Railway stations in the United States opened in 1886
Railway stations closed in 1958
Railway stations scheduled to open in 2023